John Mahr Rothman (born June 3, 1949) is an American film, television, and stage actor.

Life and career
Rothman was born in Baltimore, Maryland, the son of Elizabeth D. (née Davidson) and Donald N. Rothman, a lawyer. He is the brother of film executive Thomas Rothman.

A graduate of Wesleyan University and the Yale School of Drama, his Broadway stage credits include Richard Nelson's Some Americans Abroad and the 2007 revival of Craig Lucas's Prelude to a Kiss. 
He performed in numerous Off-Broadway productions including his own one-person play The Impossible H. L. Mencken.

Rothman portrayed Union General John F. Reynolds in Gettysburg (1993). He has appeared on such shows as Guiding Light, Blue Bloods, Law & Order, and Arrested Development.

Rothman also appeared in such comedic movies as Ghostbusters (1984), Big (1988), Jingle All the Way (1996), Say It Isn't So (2001), Welcome to Mooseport (2004), and Taxi (2004), and portrayed real-life September 11 terror victim Edward Felt in the 2006 film United 93.

Filmography

Stardust Memories (1980) as Jack Abel
Ryan's Hope (1981, TV Series) as Ralph Pugh
Sophie's Choice (1982) as Librarian
Zelig (1983) as Paul Deghuee
Ghostbusters (1984) as Roger Delacorte, Library Administrator
The Purple Rose of Cairo (1985) as Mr. Hirsch's Lawyer
Heartburn (1986) as Jonathan Rice
Three O'Clock High (1987) as Mr. Medved
Hello Again (1987) as Bearded Man
Big (1988) as Phil
The Boost (1988) as Ned
See You in the Morning (1989) as Veterinarien
Bloodhounds of Broadway (1989) as Marvin Clay
Law & Order (1990–2010, TV Series) as Expert Witness / Steven Strelzik / O'Hara / Internist
The Boy Who Cried Bitch (1991) as Stokes
Golden Years (1991, Miniseries) as Dr. Ackerman
Mamma ci penso io (1992) as U.S. Consul
The Pickle (1993) as Chauffeur
Gettysburg (1993) as Maj. Gen. John F. Reynolds
Mr. Wonderful (1993) as Ralph
NYPD Blue (1993, TV Series) as Gerald Zimmer
Where the Rivers Flow North (1993) as The Lawyer
Copycat (1995) as Andy
The Associate (1996) as Jogging Track Executive
Jingle All The Way (1996) as Mall Toy Store Manager
Childhood's End (1996) as Bernard Chute
Picture Perfect (1997) as Jim Davenport
A Further Gesture (1997) as FBI Agent No: 2
The Devil's Advocate (1997) as District Attorney Broygo
Witness to the Mob (1998, TV Movie) as White House Advisor
The Siege (1998) as Congressman Marshall
Two Ninas (1999) as Barry Litzer
24 Nights (1999) as Paul
Dinner Rush (2000) as Gary Lieberman
Pollock (2000) as Harold Rosenberg
Say It Isn't So (2001) as Larry Falwell
Plan B (2001) as Dr. Pete
Kate & Leopold (2001) as Executive #1
Unfaithful (2002) as Jerry (uncredited)
The First $20 Million Is Always the Hardest (2002) as Ben
Daredevil (2003) as Quesada Attorney
Easy (2003) as Lawrence Harris
Arrested Development (2004, TV Series) as Charles Milford
Welcome to Mooseport (2004) as Stu
Knots (2004) as Dave's Lawyer
The Door in the Floor (2004) as Minty O'Hare
I Heart Huckabees (2004) as Corporate Board #2
Taxi (2004) as Business Man
Brooklyn Lobster (2005) as Sal Guardino
Prime (2005) as Jack Bloomberg
The Ringer (2005) as Priest
United 93 (2006) as Edward P. Felt
The Devil Wears Prada (2006) as Editor
Rescue Me (2006, TV Series) as Bud
The Hoax (2006) as Puffy Man
Dark Matter (2007) as Rene
Arranged (2007) as Matan Meshenberg
Day Zero (2007) as Rifkin's Father
Reservation Road (2007) as Minister
Enchanted (2007) as Carl
Guiding Light (2007–2009, TV Series) as Judge Joe Green
The Accidental Husband (2008) as Business Man
Synecdoche, New York (2008) as Dentist
The Understudy (2008)
The Day the Earth Stood Still (2008) as Dr. Myron
Damages (2009, TV Series) as Earl Jacoby
Adam (2009) as Beranbaum
Law & Order: Criminal Intent (2009, TV Series) as Peter Evans
According to Greta (2009) as Edgar
Choose (2011) as Elliot Vincent
The Onion News Network (2011, TV Series) as Ronald Noth
White Collar (2012, TV Series) as Graham Slater
Blue Bloods (2012, TV Series) as Walter Harris
Abraham Lincoln: Vampire Hunter (2012) as Jefferson Davis
Hitchcock (2012) as Accountant (uncredited)
Northern Borders (2013) as Judge Allen
That Awkward Moment (2014) as Chelsea's Father
Affluenza (2014) as Rabbi Cohen
Law & Order: SVU (2014–2019, TV Series) as Judge Edward Kofax
Peter and John (2015) as Attorney Bennett
Stealing Chanel (2015) as Charles Borden
Her Composition (2015) as Dean
One Mississippi (2015–2017, TV Series) as Bill
Good Kids (2016) as Mr. Evans
My Art (2016) as John
Fits and Starts (2017) as Publisher
The Report (2019) as Sheldon Whitehouse
Bombshell (2019) as Martin Hyman
Small Engine Repair (2021) as Mr. Walker
 The Blacklist (2022) as Wallace Avery
 Painkiller (2022) as Mortimer Sackler

References

External links

John Rothman on Rotten Tomatoes

1949 births
Male actors from Baltimore
American male film actors
American male stage actors
Jewish American male actors
American male television actors
Living people
Wesleyan University alumni
Yale School of Drama alumni
21st-century American Jews